James T. Distler (May 22, 1934 – March 31, 2015) was a Republican member of the Pennsylvania House of Representatives.

References

Republican Party members of the Pennsylvania House of Representatives
2015 deaths
1934 births
People from St. Marys, Pennsylvania